Blood Link is a 1982 film directed by Alberto De Martino and starring Michael Moriarty and Cameron Mitchell.

Plot
Craig Manning (Michael Moriarty) is a respected doctor living in the United States, who begins to experience strange visions of women being murdered. Before long, he begins to suspect that these visions are the result of a psychic connection with his twin brother Keith (also Michael Moriarty), who supposedly died in a house fire in Cleveland at the age of 17, but who is now engaged in a murder spree. Recognizing the scenery in one of the visions, Craig travels to Hamburg, Germany to find and stop his brother, over the protests of his girlfriend Julie Warren (Penelope Milford).

Meanwhile, Keith is soon spotted and mistaken for Craig at a Hamburg coffee shop by ex-boxer Bud Waldo, (Cameron Mitchell) one Craig's former patients. Maliciously, Keith goads the older man into an impromptu boxing match, striking him repeatedly and causing a fatal heart attack. Craig arrives on the scene in time to meet Waldo's daughter Christine (Sarah Langenfeld), who joins him in his search for Keith. The two quickly become lovers, but their search is hampered by the local police (led by inspector Hessinger [Reinhold Olszewski]) who think Craig is to blame for Keith's murders. While they hide, Keith locates them, kills Christine, and finally confronts his brother, telling him he was aware of their psychic connection and that he committed the murders as a way of bringing his estranged brother to him. Craig condemns his actions, but Keith escapes, promising more murders. Shortly thereafter, the police arrive and arrest Craig, charging him with Christine's murder.

In short order, Julie arrives in Germany and—certain that Craig's visions are real—implores the local authorities in Hamburg to help search for Keith in connection to the murders that Craig is now being blamed for. While Craig sits in jail, she concocts a plan to act as bait for Keith, meeting him at a secret location and counting on Craig's psychic connection to help bring the police to her in time. Keith, psychologically unstable and obsessed with his brother, attempts to rape Julie, but during the struggle she is able to stab him to death with his own knife.

With Keith dead, the charges against Craig are dropped and he is freed from prison. He continues to have visions, however, which seem to show Keith returning from the grave. Moreover, he seems to have taken on some of Keith's personality characteristics. The film ends with some ambiguity about whether Keith is still somehow psychically affecting his brother from beyond the grave, or if Craig is simply psychologically scarred from his experience.

Cast 
 Michael Moriarty as Keith Mannings / Craig Mannings
 Penelope Milford as Julie Warren
 Geraldine Fitzgerald as Mrs. Thomason
 Cameron Mitchell as Bud Waldo
 Sarah Langenfeld as Christine Waldo
 Martha Smith as Hedwig
 Virginia McKenna as Woman in Ballroom 
 Reinhold Olszewski  as Inspector Hessinger
 Alex Diakun as  Mr. Adams
 Shaun Lawton as Man with Cigar
 Wendy Merk as Head Nurse

Production
Blood Link was shot in the United States and Germany in late 1981.  The film was financed mostly by a German production company (Zadar Films), but it was made by an Italian director and crew.

Release
Blood Link was released in 1982.
The film was released in the United States on home video by Embassy as Blood Link and in the United Kingdom by Medusa as The Link. The film was only released in De Martino's native Italy directly to video years later.

Reception
From retrospective reviews, Adrian Luther Smith in his book on Italian genre films praised the acting of Michael Moriarty and stated that "those seeking well-presented sleazy thrills will not be disappointed". Italian film critic and historian Roberto Curti stated that the film has "several interesting moments" while being "partly marred for an unsatisfactory ending imposed on by the producer".

References

Sources

External links
 
 

1982 films
English-language German films
Films directed by Alberto De Martino
Films scored by Ennio Morricone
1980s English-language films
1980s German films
Films shot in the United States
Films shot in Germany